Functional analysis is a branch of mathematical analysis, the core of which is formed by the study of vector spaces endowed with some kind of limit-related structure (for example, inner product, norm, or topology) and the linear functions defined on these spaces and respecting these structures in a suitable sense. The historical roots of functional analysis lie in the study of spaces of functions and the formulation of properties of transformations of functions such as the Fourier transform as transformations defining, for example, continuous or unitary operators between function spaces. This point of view turned out to be particularly useful for the study of differential and integral equations.

The usage of the word functional as a noun goes back to the calculus of variations, implying a function whose argument is a function. The term was first used in Hadamard's 1910 book on that subject. However, the general concept of a functional had previously been introduced in 1887 by the Italian mathematician and physicist Vito Volterra. The theory of nonlinear functionals was continued by students of Hadamard, in particular Fréchet and Lévy. Hadamard also founded the modern school of linear functional analysis further developed by Riesz and the group of Polish mathematicians around Stefan Banach.

In modern introductory texts on functional analysis, the subject is seen as the study of vector spaces endowed with a topology, in particular infinite-dimensional spaces. In contrast, linear algebra deals mostly with finite-dimensional spaces, and does not use topology. An important part of functional analysis is the extension of the theories of measure, integration, and probability to infinite dimensional spaces, also known as infinite dimensional analysis.

Normed vector spaces
The basic and historically first class of spaces studied in functional analysis are complete normed vector spaces over the real or complex numbers. Such spaces are called Banach spaces. An important example is a Hilbert space, where the norm arises from an inner product. These spaces are of fundamental importance in many areas, including the mathematical formulation of quantum mechanics, machine learning, partial differential equations, and Fourier analysis.

More generally, functional analysis includes the study of Fréchet spaces and other topological vector spaces not endowed with a norm.

An important object of study in functional analysis are the continuous linear operators defined on Banach and Hilbert spaces. These lead naturally to the definition of C*-algebras and other operator algebras.

Hilbert spaces
Hilbert spaces can be completely classified: there is a unique Hilbert space up to isomorphism for every cardinality of the orthonormal basis. Separability being important for applications, functional analysis of Hilbert spaces consequently mostly deals with this space. One of the open problems in functional analysis is to prove that every bounded linear operator on a Hilbert space has a proper invariant subspace. Many special cases of this invariant subspace problem have already been proven.

Banach spaces
General Banach spaces are more complicated than Hilbert spaces, and cannot be classified in such a simple manner as those. In particular, many Banach spaces lack a notion analogous to an orthonormal basis.

Examples of Banach spaces are -spaces for any real number  Given also a measure  on set  then  sometimes also denoted  or  has as its vectors equivalence classes  of measurable functions whose absolute value's -th power has finite integral; that is, functions  for which one has

If  is the counting measure, then the integral may be replaced by a sum. That is, we require

Then it is not necessary to deal with equivalence classes, and the space is denoted  written more simply  in the case when  is the set of non-negative integers.

In Banach spaces, a large part of the study involves the dual space: the space of all continuous linear maps from the space into its underlying field, so-called functionals. A Banach space can be canonically identified with a subspace of its bidual, which is the dual of its dual space. The corresponding map is an isometry but in general not onto. A general Banach space and its bidual need not even be isometrically isomorphic in any way, contrary to the finite-dimensional situation. This is explained in the dual space article.

Also, the notion of derivative can be extended to arbitrary functions between Banach spaces. See, for instance, the Fréchet derivative article.

Linear functional analysis

Major and foundational results

There are four major theorems which are sometimes called the four pillars of functional analysis: the Hahn–Banach theorem, the open mapping theorem, the closed graph theorem and the uniform boundedness principle, also known as the Banach–Steinhaus theorem. Important results of functional analysis include:

Uniform boundedness principle

The uniform boundedness principle or Banach–Steinhaus theorem is one of the fundamental results in functional analysis. Together with the Hahn–Banach theorem and the open mapping theorem, it is considered one of the cornerstones of the field. In its basic form, it asserts that for a family of continuous linear operators (and thus bounded operators) whose domain is a Banach space, pointwise boundedness is equivalent to uniform boundedness in operator norm.

The theorem was first published in 1927 by Stefan Banach and Hugo Steinhaus but it was also proven independently by Hans Hahn.

Spectral theorem

There are many theorems known as the spectral theorem, but one in particular has many applications in functional analysis.

This is the beginning of the vast research area of functional analysis called operator theory; see also the spectral measure.

There is also an analogous spectral theorem for bounded normal operators on Hilbert spaces. The only difference in the conclusion is that now  may be complex-valued.

Hahn–Banach theorem

The Hahn–Banach theorem is a central tool in functional analysis. It allows the extension of bounded linear functionals defined on a subspace of some vector space to the whole space, and it also shows that there are "enough" continuous linear functionals defined on every normed vector space to make the study of the dual space "interesting".

Open mapping theorem

The open mapping theorem, also known as the Banach–Schauder theorem (named after Stefan Banach and Juliusz Schauder), is a fundamental result which states that if a continuous linear operator between Banach spaces is surjective then it is an open map. More precisely,

Closed graph theorem

The closed graph theorem states the following:

Other topics

Foundations of mathematics considerations
Most spaces considered in functional analysis have infinite dimension. To show the existence of a vector space basis for such spaces may require Zorn's lemma. However, a somewhat different concept, Schauder basis, is usually more relevant in functional analysis. Many very important theorems require the Hahn–Banach theorem, usually proved using the axiom of choice, although the strictly weaker Boolean prime ideal theorem suffices. The Baire category theorem, needed to prove many important theorems, also requires a form of axiom of choice.

Points of view
Functional analysis in its  includes the following tendencies:
Abstract analysis. An approach to analysis based on topological groups, topological rings, and topological vector spaces.
Geometry of Banach spaces contains many topics. One is combinatorial approach connected with Jean Bourgain; another is a characterization of Banach spaces in which various forms of the law of large numbers hold.
Noncommutative geometry. Developed by Alain Connes, partly building on earlier notions, such as George Mackey's approach to ergodic theory.
Connection with quantum mechanics. Either narrowly defined as in mathematical physics, or broadly interpreted by, for example, Israel Gelfand, to include most types of representation theory.

See also

 List of functional analysis topics
 Spectral theory

References

Further reading
 Aliprantis, C.D., Border, K.C.: Infinite Dimensional Analysis: A Hitchhiker's Guide, 3rd ed., Springer 2007, . Online  (by subscription)
 Bachman, G., Narici, L.: Functional analysis, Academic Press, 1966. (reprint Dover Publications)
 Banach S. Theory of Linear Operations. Volume 38, North-Holland Mathematical Library, 1987, 
 Brezis, H.: Analyse Fonctionnelle, Dunod  or 
 Conway, J. B.: A Course in Functional Analysis, 2nd edition, Springer-Verlag, 1994, 
 Dunford, N. and Schwartz, J.T.: Linear Operators, General Theory, John Wiley & Sons, and other 3 volumes, includes visualization charts
 Edwards, R. E.: Functional Analysis, Theory and Applications, Hold, Rinehart and Winston, 1965.
 Eidelman, Yuli, Vitali Milman, and Antonis Tsolomitis: Functional Analysis: An Introduction, American Mathematical Society, 2004.
 Friedman, A.: Foundations of Modern Analysis, Dover Publications, Paperback Edition, July 21, 2010
 Giles, J.R.: Introduction to the Analysis of Normed Linear Spaces, Cambridge University Press, 2000
 Hirsch F., Lacombe G. - "Elements of Functional Analysis", Springer 1999.
 Hutson, V., Pym, J.S., Cloud M.J.: Applications of Functional Analysis and Operator Theory, 2nd edition, Elsevier Science, 2005, 
 Kantorovitz, S.,Introduction to Modern Analysis, Oxford University Press, 2003,2nd ed.2006.
 Kolmogorov, A.N and Fomin, S.V.: Elements of the Theory of Functions and Functional Analysis, Dover Publications, 1999
 Kreyszig, E.: Introductory Functional Analysis with Applications, Wiley, 1989.
 Lax, P.: Functional Analysis, Wiley-Interscience, 2002, 
 Lebedev, L.P. and Vorovich, I.I.: Functional Analysis in Mechanics, Springer-Verlag, 2002
 Michel, Anthony N. and Charles J. Herget: Applied Algebra and Functional Analysis, Dover, 1993.
 Pietsch, Albrecht: History of Banach spaces and linear operators, Birkhäuser Boston Inc., 2007, 
 Reed, M., Simon, B.: "Functional Analysis", Academic Press 1980.
 Riesz, F. and Sz.-Nagy, B.: Functional Analysis, Dover Publications, 1990
 Rudin, W.: Functional Analysis,  McGraw-Hill Science, 1991
 Saxe, Karen: Beginning Functional Analysis, Springer, 2001
 Schechter, M.: Principles of Functional Analysis, AMS, 2nd edition, 2001
 Shilov, Georgi E.: Elementary Functional Analysis, Dover, 1996.
 Sobolev, S.L.: Applications of Functional Analysis in Mathematical Physics, AMS, 1963
 Vogt, D., Meise, R.: Introduction to Functional Analysis, Oxford University Press, 1997.
 Yosida, K.: Functional Analysis, Springer-Verlag, 6th edition, 1980

External links 

 
 Topics in Real and Functional Analysis by Gerald Teschl, University of Vienna.
 Lecture Notes on Functional Analysis by Yevgeny Vilensky, New York University.
 Lecture videos on functional analysis by Greg Morrow  from University of Colorado Colorado Springs